Perregaux may refer to: 
 Alexandre Charles Perrégaux, a French officer during the colonial conquest of Algeria.
 Jean-Frédéric Perregaux, a Swiss banker.
 Girard-Perregaux, a luxury Swiss watch manufacture.